Ernst Stankovski (16 June 1928 – 26 January 2022) was an Austrian actor.

He appeared in more than one hundred films since 1949. Stankovski died in Klosterneuburg on 26 January 2022, at the age of 93.

Selected filmography

Television Series

References

External links 
 

1928 births
2022 deaths
20th-century Austrian male actors
21st-century Austrian male actors
Austrian male film actors
Austrian male television actors
Male actors from Vienna